Punkin' Puss & Mushmouse is a cartoon produced by Hanna-Barbera and originally aired as a segment on the 1964-1966 cartoon The Magilla Gorilla Show. Punkin Puss and Mushmouse appears in Jellystone.

Plot
The show features a hillbilly cat called Punkin' Puss (voiced by Allan Melvin) who lives in a house in the woods of the southern US. Punkin' is preoccupied with a hillbilly mouse called Mushmouse (voiced by Howard Morris) who lives there too, and Punkin' frequently tries to shoot him with his rifle. In many cartoons, one of Mushmouse's cousins visits and gives Punkin' Puss a hard time.

The "Nowhere Bear" has Punkin' Puss continually disrupting an angry bear's sleep. The episode "Small Change" has Punkin' Puss (and later a dog as well) shrinking to mouse size.

Episodes

Voice cast
The voice cast included:
 Allan Melvin - Punkin' Puss
 Howard Morris -  Mushmouse

Other appearances
 Punkin' Puss can be seen as an animatronic in the Dexter's Laboratory episode "Chubby Cheese". 
 Punkin' Puss and Mushmouse will both appear in Jellystone!.

Punkin' Puss & Mushmouse in other languages
 Brazilian Portuguese: Bacamarte & Chumbinho
 Français: Chat-des-Champs et Souriceau
 Italian: Gatto Bernardo e Topo Didì
 Spanish: El ratón Mush y el Calabaza
 Portuguese: Gato Saloio e o Rato Maloio

References

External links
 Punkin' Puss & Mushmouse at Wingnut Toons

Television series by Hanna-Barbera
Hanna-Barbera characters
American children's animated comedy television series
Animated television series about cats
Animated television series about mice and rats
Fictional rivalries